Grey Matter is the début full-length album from Canadian indie-rock band Wool on Wolves.  It was self-released on November 9, 2010 and produced by Nik Kozub of Shout Out Out Out Out.

Track listing
 Thick as Thieves
 Ain't Seen Mississippi
 G-Arp
 Honeybee
 The Distance Between Us
 Ports of Glass Harbour
 Bird in the Bush
 Red Roses
 One Second
 Cocaine and Bellows
 Reap and Sow

Reception
Grey Matter was positively received, with Wool on Wolves drawing comparisons to The Band, Ryan Adams, and early Wilco.  Grey Matter was nominated for a 2011 Western Canadian Music Award in the Best Rock category, and named the 7th best album of 2010 by Edmonton Journal writer Sandra Sperounes.

References

2010 debut albums